Eastgate may refer to:

Places

Canada
 Eastgate, Alberta, Canada
 Eastgate, British Columbia, Canada

United Kingdom
 Eastgate, County Durham, England
 Eastgate, Norfolk, England
 Eastgate, Peterborough, Cambridgeshire, England
 Eastgate, Chester, a gate through the Roman walls, with a clock above 
 Eastgate, a fictional town in the UK TV series Dad's Army

United States
 Eastgate, Orange County, Florida, a place in Florida
 Eastgate, Manatee County, Florida, a place in Florida
 Eastgate, Sarasota County, Florida, a place in Florida
 Eastgate, Indiana, an unincorporated town in Vernon Township, Hancock County, Indiana
 Eastgate, Indianapolis, Indiana
 Eastgate, Nevada
 Eastgate, Ohio, a neighbourhood of Columbus
 Eastgate, Roanoke, Virginia, a neighborhood
 Eastgate, Texas
 Eastgate, Bellevue, Washington

Other uses
 Eastgate Airport, part of AFB Hoedspruit, South Africa
 Eastgate and Eastgate Clock, a city gate and clock in Chester, England
 Eastgate Bondi Junction, a shopping centre in Sydney, Australia
 Eastgate Centre, Harare, Zimbabwe
 Eastgate Shopping Centre, Johannesburg, South Africa
 Eastgate Hotel, Oxford, England
 Eastgate Mall (disambiguation), including Eastgate Shopping Centre
 Eastgate Square, a shopping center in Hamilton, Ontario, Canada
 Eastgate Systems, a software company and hypertext fiction publisher located in Watertown, Massachusetts, United States
 Eastgate, a former name of Piccadilly Tower, Manchester, England
 Gloucester Eastgate railway station, a defunct station in Gloucester, England
 Peter Eastgate (born 1985), Danish poker player

See also
East Gate (disambiguation)